Cadillacs and Dinosaurs is an animated television series produced by De Souza Productions, Galaxy Films and Nelvana, which aired on CBS as part of its Saturday morning children's lineup in the United States from 1993 to 1994, lasting for one season of 13 episodes. Based on Xenozoic Tales by Mark Schultz, the show was created by screenwriter Steven E. de Souza, who acquired the TV rights after producing the video game Cadillacs and Dinosaurs, which was also based on Schultz's comic. The show dealt with many strong ecological and political issues that were central to the plot development.

Plot
The series chronicles the exploits of Jack Tenrec and his crew of ecological freedom fighters known as the "Mechanics".  Set in the year 2513, the series takes place in a post-apocalyptic jungle in the vicinity of the ruins of New York City (now known as "The City in the Sea"); societies have had to re-learn 20th-century technology, lost due to a never-explicitly-stated catastrophe, and have only been partially successful in doing so, though the Mechanics have maintained much "Old World" technology and knowledge. His often-reluctant companion is Hannah Dundee, an ambassador from Wasoon, somewhere further south, which is technologically much further behind than the City in the Sea is. She hires Jack as a liaison, while she attempts to create clear communication between her land and the modern civilization. Since the catastrophe, much of the former United States has gone wild, with many species of dinosaurs spontaneously reappearing after going extinct. Together, Jack and Hannah confront the serious issues facing the futuristic environment that humanity has come to inhabit.

Jack also has Hermes, a juvenile "cutter" that Jack hand-reared after the latter's mother's death. Gentle with Jack and Hannah, he can still be rather fierce when angered. The show also includes a race of intelligent lizards called "Griths".

Jack and his crew square off against opposition, including the triumvirate Council of Governors, particularly Jack's archenemy Wilhelmina Scharnhorst, and Hammer Terhune's gang.

Cast
 Jack Tenrec (voiced by David Keeley) – A survival-savvy garage mechanic who is a member of the Old Blood Mechanics. Jack has a passion for restoring classic car shells (mainly those of Cadillacs) which the Mechanics use as their mode of transportation.
 Hannah Dundee (voiced by Susan Roman) – A foreign ambassador from Wasoon who is Jack's constant companion and love interest. She is often on a mission to stop Jack from running his enemies into his neighbors' territory.
 Mustapha Cairo (voiced by Bruce Tubbe) – Jack's companion who often helps Jack in his endeavors. He is an engineer.
 Kirgo (voiced by David Fox) – A ferryman associated with the City in the Sea and a friend of Jack.
 Hermes – A juvenile "Cutter" (Allosaurus) that was raised by Jack. Although he is gentle towards Jack and Hannah, Hermes can still be rather fierce when angered.
 Council of Governors – A council that rules the City in the Sea.
 Governor Wilhelmina Scharnhorst (voiced by Dawn Greenhalgh) – Corrupt, power-hungry, masculine, and uncaring of the balance of nature, Wilhelmina is one of the three governors in the City in the Sea, and Jack's nemesis. Wilhelmina has hired Hammer Terhune and his gang to do her dirty work. Despite her callous nature and disdain for Jack, whom she sees as an obstacle to her rise to power and to humanity's dominance as a whole, Wilhelmina only wants what's best for her city and knows when to respect Jack, though it's usually only when doing so will benefit her interests as well.
 Governor Dahlgren (voiced by Kristina Nicoll) – A female who is the voice of reason to the governors. Her governing styles are said to have been heavily influenced by Jack. Dahlgren has a bad habit of flirting with any man and is implied to have a crush on Jack, much to Hannah's chagrin.
 Governor Toulouse (voiced by Philip Williams) – Toulouse is the public relations man of the governors. His concerns all lie on the morale and attitude of the public regarding potential problems. Even though Toulouse means well, he is not used to the outdoor lifestyles of Jack Tenrec.
 Nock (voiced by Don Dickinson) – The Captain of the Guards in the City in the Sea. He is one of the people who have a dislike for Jack Tenrec. Nock is a sycophant and a very corrupt officer, obeying Scharnhorst without caring if she is wrong, lying any time and to anyone he deems convenient, and even trying to pull off scams.
 Dr. Fessenden (voiced by John Stocker) – A mad scientist who would often invent some technology for Wilhelmina to use, particularly radio-based gadgets (his name coming from radio pioneer Reginald Fessenden).
 Hammer Terhune (voiced by Ted Dillon) – A burly poacher who would often attack Jack Tenrec. Although he was hired by Wilhelmina Scharnhorst, he shows no respect to her unless she has some technology for him to use and would betray her if he sees a chance.
 Wrench Terhune (voiced by Colin O'Meara) – Hammer's younger brother who wears a headband.
 Vice Terhune (voiced by Frank Pellegrino) – Hammer's younger brother who wears a ponytail.
 Mikla (voiced by Lenore Zann) – A female who is a member of Hammer's gang.
 Griths – A race of lizard men who reside in caverns.
 Hobb (voiced by Don Francks) – A Grith who serves as Jack's translator to the Griths due to his telepathy.
 Wild Boy – A wild child raised by the Griths that wears a loincloth and animal hide boots. He does not speak any human language, but can communicate with the dinosaurs. The Griths raised the Wild Boy ever since saving him from the cave hyenas. He first appears in "Wild Child" where Jack and Hanna discover him and try to keep him out of Hammer Terhune's clutches while returning him to the Griths. In "Duel", the Wild Boy later brings Jack and Hannah to the Griths at the time when Jack's old friend Sean has stolen their lifestone.

Creatures
Many of the dinosaurs (commonly referred to as "slithers") and other prehistoric creatures featured in this series are referred to by different names:
 Cutter  – Allosaurus
 Shivet – Tyrannosaurus
 Mack – Triceratops
 Sandbuck – Apatosaurus
 Tri-colored Sandbuck – Diplodocus
 Wahonchuck – Stegosaurus
 Whiptail – Nothosaurus
 Thresher – Mosasaurus
 Zeek  – Pteranodon
 Bonehead – Pachycephalosaurus
 Tree Grazer – Brachiosaurus
 Hornbill – Parasaurolophus
 Crawler – Ankylosaurus
 Deinonychus
 Velociraptor
 Dimetrodon
 Glyptodon
 Cave hyena
 Woolly mammoth
 Peramus
 Phorusrhacos
 Troodon
 Eoraptor
 Machairodus
 Compsognathus
 Coelophysis
 Struthiomimus
 Protoceratops
 Mixosaurus
 Stegoceras

Episodes

Release

Broadcast
In Canada, the show premiered on October 2, 1993, on YTV.

The show aired in the Republic of Ireland on RTÉ Two from 29 August 1995 to 1996. In addition, the series has aired for many years on HBO Family in Latin America, where the episodes can be viewed dubbed in Spanish or in their original English. In 2002, the series has Spanish-dubbed aired on Telefutura, as part of Toonturama block until 2003.

Home media
Select episodes were released on VHS in the 1990s by Sony Wonder. Only the first two episodes of the show are available in the United States through the video retailer Amazon Video, and in Canada it was available through the streaming video service Shomi until the service was cancelled. In 2015, the entire series was made available for free viewing through the Nelvana Retro channel on YouTube, renamed YTV Direct in 2016. YTV Direct was renamed to Keep It Weird in 2018 and no longer features the show. In 2019, Retro Rerun uploaded all of the episodes on their YouTube channel.

Reception

Critical response
Esther Sinclair, UCLA associate professor of psychiatry and bio-behavioral sciences, analyzed the message of the show: "Jack is altruistic, does not have aggressive impulses, resists temptation and is sympathetic toward others. . . . The viewer may draw an analogy to other endangered species such as eagles and condors. . . . There is an emphasis on the interconnection of all living things. Jack respects all life forms".

References

External links
 
 Cadillacs and Dinosaurs on TV.com
 Cadillacs and Dinosaurs at Don Markstein's Toonopedia.
 Cadillacs and Dinosaurs at Flying Omelette.com
 Cadillacs and Dinosaurs on Allmovie
 Cadillacs and Dinosaurs on The New York Times
 Cadillacs and Dinosaurs
 Cadillacs and Dinosaurs
 Cadillacs and Dinosaurs at 123 car games.com
 Cadillacs and Dinosaurs

1993 American television series debuts
1994 American television series endings
1990s American animated television series
1993 Canadian television series debuts
1994 Canadian television series endings
1990s Canadian animated television series
American children's animated action television series
American children's animated adventure television series
American children's animated science fantasy television series
Cadillac
Canadian children's animated action television series
Canadian children's animated adventure television series
Canadian children's animated science fantasy television series
CBS original programming
English-language television shows
Post-apocalyptic animated television series
Television shows based on comics
Animated television series about dinosaurs
Television series by Nelvana
Television series set in the 26th century
Television series created by Steven E. de Souza